Zaitovo (Zäyet) is a rural locality (a village) in Krasnozilimsky Selsoviet, Arkhangelsky District, Bashkortostan, Russia. The population was 238 as of 2010. There are 5 streets.

Geography 
Zaitovo is located 16 km southwest of Arkhangelskoye (the district's administrative centre) by road. Kysyndy is the nearest rural locality.

References 

Rural localities in Arkhangelsky District